The Pasdeloup Orchestra (also referred to as Orchestre des Concerts Pasdeloup) is the oldest symphony orchestra in France.

History 
Founded in 1861 by Jules Pasdeloup with the name Concerts Populaires, it is the oldest orchestra still in existence in Paris. Aimed at an audience hitherto absent from evening concerts, the orchestra presented cheap Sunday concerts in the vast rotonda of the Cirque d'hiver in Paris. The opening concert (27 October 1861), with an orchestra of 80 musicians, consisted of the following programme:

 Overture to Oberon by Carl Maria von Weber
 Beethoven’s Pastoral Symphony
 Mendelssohn's Violin Concerto with Jean Alard
 the Emperor's Hymn by Joseph Haydn.

Rehearsals took place on Tuesday and Thursday at the Conservatoire and on Saturday at the Cirque d'hiver (musicians were paid 15 francs per concert with rehearsals). The first leader was Lancien, of the orchestra of the Paris Opéra. Early concerts included music by Berlioz and Wagner.

The enterprise was a great success and the Concerts Populaires became a genuine institution, playing a lead role in forming a new audience through making known the Austro-German repertoire and also by influencing the creation of French symphonic works.

Pasdeloup continued his activity until 1884 and tried in vain to restart in 1886 by mounting a festival devoted to César Franck (which was a success).

The orchestra started up again in 1919, under the guidance of Serge Sandberg, with the title Orchestre Pasdeloup.

Principal conductors 
 Jules Pasdeloup (1861–1887)
 Rhené-Baton (1919–1933)
 Albert Wolff (1925–1928) and (1934–1970)
 Désiré-Émile Inghelbrecht (1928–1932)
 Gérard Devos (1970–1990)
André Caplet was the deputy chief conductor from 1922 to 1925. Since 1990, the orchestra has not had a permanent principal conductor and has been run by a committee; from 2000 this has been chaired by the violinist Marianne Rivière.

Patrice Fontanarosa is the current artistic advisor for the orchestra, while Jean-Christophe Keck oversees the direction of the Offenbach concerts. Conductor Wolfgang Doerner has regularly lead the orchestra each season since 1987.

Premieres
 Georges Bizet: Symphony "Roma", 1869 (3 movements only) – L'Arlésienne Suites No 1 and 2, 1872 – Patrie overture, 1874
 Camille Saint-Saëns: Le Rouet d'Omphale, 1872
 Édouard Lalo: Symphonie espagnole, 1875 – Le Roi d'Ys, overture, 1876
 Henri Duparc : Léonore, 1877
 Louis Aubert: Habanera, 1919
 Maurice Ravel: Alborada del gracioso, 1919 – Le tombeau de Couperin, 1929
 Lili Boulanger: D'un matin du printemps and D'un soir triste, 1920 
 Darius Milhaud: Les Choéphores, concert version, 1927 – Concerto for piano No. 1, 1931
 Georges Migot: Symphony No. 1, 1922 – La Jungle, 1932
 Pierre Capdevielle: Incantation pour la mort d'un Jeune Spartiate, 1933
 Raymond Loucheur: Symphony No. 1, 1935
 Albert Roussel: Symphony No. 2, 1922; Symphony No. 4, 1935
 Marcel Landowski: Rythmes du monde, 1941; Concerto for piano No. 1, 1942; Symphony No. 1, 1949; Les Noces de la Nuit, 1962
 Jean Martinon: Symphony No. 2, 1945
 Henri Tomasi: Chant pour le Viêt-Nam, 1969
 Henri Sauguet: Symphony No. 4, 1971
 Jacques Charpentier: Symphony No. 5, 1977

Discography 
 Berlioz: La Damnation de Faust, Op. 24 (slightly abridged) with Marguerite Mireille Berthon, Jose de Trevi, Charles Panzéra, Louis Morturier, conducted by Piero Coppola 
 Borodin: In the Steppes of Central Asia, Désiré-Émile Inghelbrecht
 Charpentier  La Vie du Poète (conducted by the composer)
 Debussy: La Damoiselle élue with Odette Ricquier, Jeanne Guyla, Piero Coppola; Petite Suite, Désiré-Émile Inghelbrecht
 Dukas: L'apprenti sorcier, Désiré-Émile Inghelbrecht
 Franck: Symphony, Rhené-Baton
 Mozart: Piano Concerto No. 26 in D major, K. 537 Magda Tagliaferro, conducted by Reynaldo Hahn
 Offenbach: Le Financier et le Savetier, conducted by Jean-Christophe Keck 
 Richard Strauss: Dance of the Seven Veils, Piero Coppola

External links

References 

French orchestras
Musical groups established in 1861
1861 establishments in France
Musical groups from Paris